George F. Addes (August 26, 1911 – June 19, 1990) was a founder of the United Automobile Workers of America (UAW) union and its secretary-treasurer from 1936 until 1947.  Along with R. J. Thomas and Richard Frankensteen, he was a leader of the pro-Communist left-wing faction of the UAW.

Background

George F.Addes was born on August 26, 1911, in La Crosse, Wisconsin, came from Lebanese ancestry, and grew up in Toledo, Ohio.

Career
At age 17, Addes went to work at the Willys Overland plant in Toledo.

Addes and Richard Frankensteen led a major faction of the UAW, supporting piecework and incentive pay in auto plants. The other faction, led by Walter Reuther, accused them both of being communists. Addes participated in the Battle of the Overpass.  In 1947, he lost his executive position to Emil Mazey.

After leaving the UAW, Addes joined Ford Motor Company, from which he retired in 1975.

Personal life and death
Addes married Gloria Saba; they had three children.

George F. Addes died age 79 on June 19, 1990, at the Bon Secours Hospital in Grosse Pointe, Michigan.

See also

Battle of the Overpass
Communists in the U.S. Labor Movement (1919-1937)

References

Further reading
 Barnard, John, American Vanguard: A History of the United Auto Workers, 1935–1970 (2004) .
 Fink, Gary M. Biographical Dictionary of American Labor Leaders(Greenwood Press, 1974). pp. 4-5.
 Halpern, Martin. "The 1939 UAW convention: Turning point for communist power in the auto union?" Labor History 33.2 (1992): 190-216.

 Kraus, Henry. Heroes of Unwritten Story: The UAW, 1934–1939 (University of Illinois Press, 1993).

External links
UAW War Policy Collection

American politicians of Lebanese descent
Politicians from La Crosse, Wisconsin
1911 births
1990 deaths